Roberdel, also known as Roberdell, is an unincorporated community and census-designated place (CDP) in Richmond County, North Carolina, United States. It was first listed as a CDP in the 2020 census with a population of 246.

It sits on the north side of Hitchcock Creek, a southwest-flowing tributary of the Pee Dee River. The Roberdel Mill No. 1 Company Store was listed on the National Register of Historic Places in 1983.

Demographics

2020 census

Note: the US Census treats Hispanic/Latino as an ethnic category. This table excludes Latinos from the racial categories and assigns them to a separate category. Hispanics/Latinos can be of any race.

References 

Census-designated places in Richmond County, North Carolina
Census-designated places in North Carolina